Alpine is a historic plantation house in Alpine, Alabama, United States.  Completed in 1858, the two-story Greek Revival-style house was built for Nathaniel Welch by a master builder, Almarion Devalco Bell.  The wood-frame house has several unusual features that make it one of the more architecturally interesting antebellum houses in the state. These features include the foundation materials, interior floor-plan, and the window fenestration.

History
Nathaniel Welch was born in Madison County, Virginia on November 24, 1814, the son of the Reverend Oliver Welch, a Baptist minister. Oliver Welch was a founder of the Alpine Baptist Church. He built the simple two-story hewn-log house at his homestead nearby, known as Kingston, upon his arrival from Virginia in 1832.  The Welch family was intermarried with the Reynolds family, of the now-destroyed Mount Ida nearby.

Nathaniel Welch married Mary Jane Wilson on January 7, 1840.  Nathaniel Welch died on November 4, 1883, followed by Mary Jane on January 16, 1902.  Over time, a town grew up around the plantation when a railroad came through.  Initially known as Welchs Depot, it eventually came to be known as Alpine, in honor of the plantation.  The plantation remained in the Welch family until 1970.

Architecture
Approached via a  mi (0.4 km) long avenue of mature oak trees, the house sits upon the crest of a hillock. The portico shelters the main front entrance in addition to a second story balcony with an intricate cast iron balustrade and matching upper doorway. The relatively simple 6-over-6 lite front windows, in addition to the doors on the first and second levels, are all flanked by sidelights, creating an unusual three-part window arrangement.

It was designed as a refuge from the state's hot and humid summer weather. Interior stone stairs rise from the cellar room to the ground floor. The rear left side of the house has a one-story attached ell wing, originally used as a domestic wing. When the house was inventoried by the Historic American Buildings Survey in 1937, the grounds contained a detached wood-frame kitchen building, with a build-date contemporaneous with that of the main house, a smokehouse, and a storehouse. The storehouse was demolished in 1970 and the timber reused to build a modern carport.

See also
List of plantations in Alabama

References

Greek Revival houses in Alabama
Plantation houses in Alabama
Houses in Talladega County, Alabama
Houses completed in 1858